The Daihatsu K-series is a series of three unrelated engine families (KF, KR and K3/KJ), even though named with same initial "K" letter code. These engines were built in DOHC 12-valve inline three (KF & KR) and DOHC 16-valve inline four (K3/KJ) engine layout, ranging from 0.66 L, 1.0 L and up to 1.3 L. All engine families are available in naturally aspirated and turbocharged form. The new KF weighs 47kg (103lbs) witch is 25% of the old EF witch weighs 59kg (130lbs)

KF 
Introduced in November 2005, Daihatsu KF engine is a series of 658 cc inline-three cylinder DOHC 12 valve water-cooled engine, designed for kei cars. This engine replacing the old EF series engine.

K3 

The Daihatsu K3 engine is a series of 1.3 L 4-cylinder DOHC 16-valve, water-cooled gasoline engine developed and produced by Daihatsu since April 2000, replacing Daihatsu HC engine. This engine also known as Toyota 2SZ-FE engine. The stroked up version of this engine is called 3SZ-VE engine (1.5 L) and stroked down version is called KJ-VET engine (1.0 L).

KJ 
The Daihatsu KJ-VET engine is a turbocharged 1.0 L 4-cylinder DOHC 16-valve, water-cooled gasoline engine developed and produced by Daihatsu. This short lived engine only available for Daihatsu Boon X4. This engine is a stroked down version of K3-VET engine.

KR 
A 1.0 L inline 3-cylinder engine series  designed and produced by Daihatsu.

References 

Daihatsu engines